Child's slave is a term used in China to describe parents, especially those born in the 1980s, who are under financial, physical, or mental pressure when raising their children. Parents who are "child's slaves" often lose their self-value and sense of purpose because they live and work solely for their children. The children themselves are usually spoiled by their parents' indulgence.

Major causes

High living cost
The main reason behind this phenomenon is the rising cost of raising a child, for instance, in housing, food, education and transportation. According to the gynecologists in China, it cost about 40 RMB to give birth in 1980s, while it costs over 4,000 RMB today. However, even more money is spent on education because of the fierce competition in China. These huge expenditures force parents to become "child's slaves". Some married couples may develop child phobia from this situation.

One-child policy
Parents in China could have only one child under the one-child policy, which led to excessive parental expectations. With parents putting all their hopes and dreams on the only child, the parents were likely to be over-protective and materially over-provide for them.

Personal psychological factor
In Chinese traditional culture, family is considered as a center of society. This concept remains the same now and the child becomes the center of family. The parents who are "child's slaves" are mostly post-80s, who grew up in a special circumstance. As the first generation growing under single child policy, they had no siblings and were the center of family as well. Therefore, they are self-oriented and have difficulty of expressing their emotions. They use materials and money to show their love towards their children. This gives them a heavy burden and makes them become "child's slave" eventually.

Characteristics

 Most of them are young parents, born in the 80s
 Put their child as the only center of their life
 Under the great pressure of raising a child 
 Spend most of the family income on child irrationally 
 Put all their hopes and pay too much attention on child
 Spoil their child and avoid them from suffering
 Give up work and interpersonal activities in order to take care of their child

Effects

Effects on children
The child is usually well-taken care of, even spoiled, by his parents. Because the parents prepare every aspect of the child's life, the child may have low self-care ability and be over-dependent on his parents. However, he gains sufficient supports, both financially and mentally, to focus on his own interests, which may lead to temporary success, but ultimately reduces his ability to face failure.

Additionally, since the child is spoiled by his parents, he takes parents' love for granted, and may even regard them as servants. This might affect the child's personality by causing him to develop the so-called prince illness. Moreover, a lack of sense of responsibility slows down the mental maturity of children raised in this manner.

Effects on family
Since the child is the center of the family, the parents are willing to give up their own life goals in order to focus on the growth of the child. High expectation is imposed to the kid, and it might worsen the relationship between the child and parents due to the severe upbringing

Effects on society
For the whole society, a generation of spoilt children does little contribution to social development. They are selfish and lazy, unwilling to work hard.

Aging society is another problem. If young couples refuse to give birth because of the fear of becoming "child's slaves", the labor force of society will be reduced.

Situation in China
"Child's slave" has become a common situation in modern China. Many young parents, especially those born in the 1980s, are called "child's slaves" to describe the heavy burden on them.

More than 80% of young parents feel great pressure under the burden of raising a child because of high expenses incurred as the child grows up. To ensure their child grow in a better environment, young parents are willing to spend most of their income on them. The common situation of buying expensive imported milk powder is a representation. The average cost for raising up a child from birth to grade six is RMB 450,000, despite the extra spending like traveling or studying abroad. In big cities like Beijing and Shanghai, the cost is even much higher.

Moreover, most of these young parents also have other "name-tags", including "mortgage's slave", "card's slave" and "car's slave", which indicates how heavy their financial pressure are. It is because of the inflation in China and also their wills of providing a better living environment to their family and child. Apart from the financial pressure, "Child's slaves" sacrifice their own life for the child. Some of them give up personal career and shorten their leisure time to take care of the child, or some of them work day and night to earn money for their child.

In popular culture

TV drama
 "Child's Slave"(Chinese: 孩奴) – By CCTV of China in 2012
 “The Sweet Burden” (Chinese:小兒難養) – By Hunan TV World of China in 2013
 “Baby” (Chinese: 寶貝) – By YOUHUG of China in 2013

See also
One-child policy
Helicopter parent
Parenting styles

References

External links
 "Are you are Child's Slave?" Video (Chinese: 你是孩奴嗎?)
 http://news.cntv.cn/program/yexian/20110919/100072.shtml
 "Mocking from "child's slaves" : Children is luxury goods with continuously spending" Video (Chinese: "孩奴"吐糟：孩子是持續消費的奢侈品)
 http://www.chinanews.com/shipin/2013/01-16/news160144.shtml

Social issues in China
Chinese slang
Chinese culture